The Lucchese crime family (pronounced ) is an Italian-American Mafia crime family and one of the "Five Families" that dominate organized crime activities in New York City, in the United States, within the nationwide criminal phenomenon known as the American Mafia. Members refer to the organization as the Lucchese borgata; borgata (or brugard) is Mafia slang for criminal gang, which itself was derived from Sicilian word meaning close-knit community. The members of other crime families sometimes refer to Lucchese family members as "Lukes".

The family originated in the early 1920s with Gaetano Reina serving as boss up until his murder in 1930. It was taken over by Tommy Gagliano during the Castellammarese War, and led by him until his death in 1951. Known as the Gagliano crime family under Gagliano, the family kept their activities low-key, with their efforts concentrated in the Bronx, Manhattan, and New Jersey.

The next boss was Tommy Lucchese, who had served as Gagliano's underboss for over 20 years. Lucchese led the family to become one of the most powerful families to sit on  the Commission. Lucchese teamed up with Gambino crime family boss Carlo Gambino to control organized crime in New York City. Lucchese had a stronghold on the garment industry in New York and took control of many crime rackets for the family.

When Lucchese died of a brain tumor in 1967, Carmine Tramunti controlled the family for a brief time; he was arrested in 1973 for funding a major heroin network and died five years later. Anthony Corallo then gained control of the family. Corallo was very secretive and soon became one of the most powerful members of the Commission. He was arrested and convicted in the famous Mafia Commission Trial of 1986.

For most of its history, the Lucchese family was reckoned as one of the most peaceful crime families in the nation. However, that changed when Corallo named Victor Amuso as his successor shortly before going to prison. Amuso later promoted one of his closest allies, Anthony Casso, to underboss. Starting in 1986, Amuso and Casso instituted one of the bloodiest reigns in Mafia history, ordering virtually anyone who crossed them to be murdered. It is estimated that Casso himself murdered between 30 and 40 people and ordered over 100 murders during his reign; he was sentenced to 455 years in prison. Casso also had authority over NYPD detectives Louis Eppolito and Stephen Caracappa; both carried out at least eight murders for him.

Amuso was arrested in 1991 and sentenced to life in prison. Several Lucchese family members, fearing for their lives, turned informant. The highest profile of these was acting boss Alphonse D'Arco, who became the first boss of a New York crime family to testify against the mob. This led to the arrests of the entire Lucchese family hierarchy, with Casso also becoming an informant. Testimony from these informants nearly destroyed the family, with as many as half of its members winding up incarcerated. Amuso continues to rule the family from prison.

History

Early history
The early history of the Lucchese crime family can be traced to members of the Morello gang based in East Harlem and the Bronx. Gaetano "Tommy" Reina would leave the Morellos around the time of World War I and created his own family based in East Harlem and the Bronx. As the family's leader, Reina avoided the Mafia-Cammora War for control over New York City. He instead focused on controlling the home ice distribution business throughout New York City.

During the early 1920s, Reina became a powerful Prohibition era boss and aligned himself with Joseph Masseria, the most powerful Italian-American crime boss in New York. In 1930, the Castellammarese War began as Masseria fought with rival Sicilian boss Salvatore Maranzano. At this point, Masseria started demanding a share of Reina's criminal profits, prompting Reina to consider changing allegiance to Maranzano. When Masseria learned of Reina's possible betrayal, he plotted with Reina lieutenant Tommy Gagliano to kill him.

On February 26, 1930, gunman Vito Genovese murdered Reina outside his aunt's apartment. With Reina dead, Masseria bypassed Gagliano, who expected to take control of the Reina gang, and installed his underling Joseph "Fat Joe" Pinzolo as boss. Furious with this betrayal, Gagliano and Tommy Lucchese secretly defected to Maranzano. In September 1930, Lucchese lured Pinzolo to a Manhattan office building, where Pinzolo was killed. This allowed Gagliano to take control of the Reina family, months later on April 15, 1931, Masseria was murdered ending the war.

The Two Tommies

After the murder of Masseria, a Mafia meeting was hosted by Maranzano and he proclaim himself the new Capo di tutti capi (boss of all bosses) of the American Mafia. Maranzano outlined a peace plan to all the Sicilian and Italian Mafia leaders in the United States. There would be 24 organizations (to be known as "families") throughout the country who would elect their own bosses. Maranzano also reorganized all the Italian-American gangs in New York City into five families to be headed by Lucky Luciano, Vincent Mangano, Joseph Profaci, Gagliano, and himself. Gagliano was awarded the old Reina organization, with Lucchese as his underboss.

However, Luciano and other mob members were not willing to serve under Maranzano. When Maranzano learned about Luciano's disaffection, he hired a gunman to kill him. However, in September 1931 Luciano struck first. Several Jewish assassins provided by Luciano associate Meyer Lansky murdered Maranzano in his office. Luciano now became the most powerful mobster in New York.

Luciano kept the family structure as created by Maranzano, but removed the boss of bosses in favor of a ruling body, The Commission. The Commission's responsibility was to regulate the families' affairs and resolve all differences between the families. The first Commission members included Luciano, Gagliano, Bonanno, Profaci, Mangano, Chicago Outfit boss Al "Scarface" Capone and Buffalo family boss Stefano Magaddino, with Luciano as chairman. Although the Commission was technically a democratic institution, it was actually controlled by Luciano and his allies.

During the 1930s and 1940s, Gagliano and Lucchese led their family into profitable areas of the trucking and clothing industries. When Luciano was sent to prison for pandering in 1936, a rival alliance took control of the Commission. The alliance of Mangano, Bonanno, Buffalo crime family boss Stefano Magaddino, and Profaci used their power to control organized crime in America. Understanding his vulnerability, Gagliano was careful to avoid opposing this new alliance. Gagliano was a quiet man who avoided the media and stayed off the streets. He preferred to pass his orders to the family though Lucchese and a few other close allies.

In contrast, Lucchese was the public face of the family who carried out Gagliano's orders. In 1946, Lucchese attended the Cosa Nostra Havana Conference in Cuba on behalf of Gagliano. Gagliano kept such a low profile that virtually nothing is known about his activities from 1932 until he retired or died between 1951 and 1953.

Lucchese era

After Gagliano's retirement or death, Lucchese became boss and appointed Vincenzo Rao as his consigliere and Stefano LaSalle as his underboss. Lucchese continued Gagliano's policies, making the now Lucchese family one of the most profitable in New York. Lucchese established control over Teamsters union locals, workers' co-operatives and trade associations, and rackets at the new Idlewild Airport. Lucchese also expanded family rackets in Manhattan's Garment District and in related trucking industry activities around New York City.

Lucchese built close relations with many powerful New York politicians, including Mayors William O'Dwyer and Vincent Impellitteri and members of the judiciary, who aided the family on numerous occasions. Throughout his regime, Lucchese kept a low profile and saw to it that his men were well taken care of.

During the 1950s, Lucchese controlled a narcotic trafficking network with Santo Trafficante Jr., the boss of the Tampa crime family. Trafficante Jr. would frequently meet with Lucchese in New York City for dinner.

When Lucchese became boss, he helped Vito Genovese and Carlo Gambino in their fights to take control of their families. The three plotted to take over the Mafia Commission by murdering family bosses Frank Costello and Albert Anastasia. On May 2, 1957 Costello survived an assassination attempt and immediately decided to retire as boss in favor of Genovese. Then on October 25, 1957, the Gallo brothers (from the Colombo family) murdered Anastasia, allowing Gambino to become boss.

Lucchese and Gambino then started conspiring to remove their former ally Genovese. After the disastrous 1957 Apalachin meeting of mob leaders in Upstate New York, Genovese lost a great deal of respect in the Commission. In 1959, with the assistance of Luciano, Costello, and Meyer Lansky, Genovese was arrested on drug charges.

Gambino and Lucchese assumed full control of the Mafia Commission. In 1960, they backed the Gallo brothers in their rebellion against Profaci family boss Joe Profaci. Gambino and Lucchese saw the war as a way to take over rackets from the distracted Profacis. After uncovering a plot by Joseph Bonanno to assassinate them, Lucchese and Gambino used the Commission to strip Bonanno of his role as boss. This power play started a war within the Bonanno family and served to strengthen both the Lucchese and Gambino families.

In 1962, Gambino's oldest son Thomas married Lucchese's daughter Frances, strengthening the Gambino-Lucchese alliance. Lucchese led a quiet, stable life until his death from a brain tumor on July 13, 1967. At the time of his death, he had not spent a day in jail in 44 years.

Lucchese left his family in a very powerful position in New York City. The Lucchese family had a stronghold in East Harlem and the Bronx and consisted of about 200 made members. Lucchese intended for longtime capo Anthony Corallo to succeed him. However, since he was imprisoned at the time, he named another longtime capo, Carmine Tramunti, as acting boss until Corallo's release.

Tramunti and the French Connection
Around the time of his appointment as temporary boss, Carmine "Mr. Gribbs" Tramunti was in ill health. With boss-in-waiting Anthony "Tony Ducks" Corallo in prison, Tramunti was expected to hold power until Corallo's release. Tramunti faced a number of criminal charges during his time as acting boss and was eventually convicted of financing a large heroin smuggling operation, the infamous French Connection. This scheme was responsible for distributing millions of dollars in heroin along the East Coast during the early seventies.

Before the French Connection trial, the seized heroin was stored in the NYPD property/evidence storage room pending trial. In a brazen scheme, criminals stole hundreds of kilograms of heroin worth $70 million from the room and replaced them with bags of flour. Officers discovered the theft when they noticed insects eating the so-called heroin. The scope and depth of this scheme is still unknown, but officials suspect the thieves had assistance from corrupt NYPD officers. Certain plotters received jail sentences, including Vincent Papa (later assassinated while in prison in Atlanta, Georgia), Virgil Alessi and Anthony Loria. In 1974, after Tramunti's incarceration, Corallo finally took charge of the family.

Corallo and the Jaguar

After Tramunti's incarceration in 1974, Anthony Corallo finally took control of the Lucchese family. Corallo came from the Queens faction of the family. Known as "Tony Ducks" from his ease at 'ducking' criminal convictions, Corallo was a boss squarely in Lucchese's mold. Corallo had been heavily involved in labor racketeering and worked closely with Jimmy Hoffa, the Teamsters president, during the 1940s and 1950s. Corallo also enjoyed close ties to the Painters and Decorators Union, the Conduit Workers Union, and the United Textile Workers Union. Corrallo appointed Salvatore "Tom Mix" Santoro as the underboss and supervisor of all labor and construction racketeering operations in New York, and Christopher "Christie Tick" Furnari as the reputed consigliere. The family prospered under Corallo's leadership, particularly in narcotics trafficking, labor racketeering, and major illegal gambling.

Corallo never discussed business during sit-downs, fearing that the FBI was monitoring the conversations. Instead, he used the car phone in the Jaguar owned by his bodyguard and chauffeurs. Corallo was driven around New York while on the phone discussing business. Salvatore "Sal" Avellino and Aniello "Neil" Migliore shifted as Corallo's chauffeurs during the 1970s and 1980s.

Corallo, a huge fan of the New Jersey faction of the family, reputedly inducted and promoted Anthony "Tumac" Accetturo and Michael "Mad Dog" Taccetta into the organization and put them in charge of the Jersey Crew, which reportedly controlled most of the loansharking and illegal gambling operations in Newark, New Jersey at the time.

In the early 1980s, the FBI finally managed to plant a bug in the Jaguar. The FBI recorded Corallo speaking at great length about mob affairs, including illegal gambling, labor racketeering, drug trafficking, and murder. Corallo was arrested and put on trial along with all the heads of the Five Families at the time. This trial became known as the Mafia Commission Trial.

On December 16, 1985, Gambino crime family boss Paul Castellano was murdered without Commission approval. The Genovese and Lucchese family teamed up and plotted John Gotti's murder. The alliance had Gambino underboss Frank DeCicco murdered but failed in its attempts to kill Gotti.

Corallo, Santoro and Furnari were indicted in the Mafia Commission Trial in 1986. As the trial wore on, Corallo realized that the entire Lucchese hierarchy was about to be decimated. Not only was it all but certain that he, Santoro and Furnari would be convicted, but they faced sentences that, at their ages, would all but assure they would die in prison. In the fall of 1986, Corallo chose Anthony "Buddy" Luongo as acting boss. However, Luongo disappeared in 1986.

Corallo's ultimate choice was Vittorio "Vic" Amuso, the capo of Furnari's old crew. Allegedly both Amuso and another longtime protègé of Furnari's, Anthony "Gaspipe " Casso, were candidates for the job. Evidence suggests that Corallo wanted Casso, but Casso convinced him to select Amuso instead. Amuso officially became boss in January 1987, when Corallo, Santoro and Furnari were sentenced to 100 years in prison. Amuso made Casso his underboss in 1989, allowing him to exert great influence over family decisions. Corallo and Santoro died in prison in 2000, while Furnari was released in 2014.

The iron fists of Amuso and Casso

During the late 1980s, the Lucchese family underwent a period of great turmoil. Vittorio "Vic" Amuso and his fierce underboss, Anthony "Gaspipe" Casso, the first members of the family's Brooklyn wing to head the family, instituted one of the most violent reigns in American Mafia history. Both men were heavily involved in labor racketeering, extortion, and drug trafficking and both had committed many murders. Amuso and Casso were strong rivals of Gambino crime family boss John Gotti and strong allies of Genovese crime family boss Vincent "Chin" Gigante.

They made their reputations earlier in 1986. Angry over the murder of Gambino boss Paul Castellano, Corallo and Gigante conspired to murder Gotti. Corallo gave the contract to Amuso and Casso. On April 13, 1986 a car-bombing killed Gambino underboss Frank DeCicco, but missed Gotti. This assassination attempt sparked a long and confusing 'tension' between these three crime families with many deaths reported on all sides.

During the late 1980s, Amuso began demanding 50% of the profits generated by the Jersey Crew. New Jersey leaders Anthony Accetturo and Michael Taccetta refused Amuso's demand. In retaliation, Amuso and Casso ordered the entire Jersey Crew killedthe now-infamous "whack Jersey" order. He summoned them to a meeting in Brooklyn. Fearful for their lives, all the Jersey crew members skipped the meeting and went into hiding. Taccetta and Accetturo were later put on trial in 1990.

Both Amuso and Casso were implicated in a case involving the fitting of thousands of windows in New York at inflated prices, and the pair went into hiding of that same year, naming Alphonse "Little Al" D'Arco as acting boss. For the next few years, Amuso and Casso ruled the family from afar and ordered the execution of anyone they deemed troublesome, typically because they were considered rivals or potential informants. All of this convinced many Lucchese wiseguys that Amuso and Casso were no longer acting or thinking rationally.

What followed next was a series of botched hits on family members suspected of being informants. Ironically, these hits caused several family members to actually turn informer. Amuso ordered the slaying of capo Peter "Fat Pete" Chiodo, who, along with Casso, was in charge of the Windows Case operation. He was shot 12 times, but still survived. After Amuso ordered hits on Chiodo's wife and sister in violation of longstanding rules against women being harmed, Chiodo turned state's evidence and provided the entire windows operation that eventually controlled $150 million in window replacements, sold in New York City. As Amuso also sanctioned the hit on Anthony Accetturo, who was on trial in 1990, he also cooperated with the government.

The planned executions went as high as acting boss D'Arco. Furious over the failed hit on Chiodo, Amuso set up D'Arco to be killed at a Manhattan hotel. However, this hit also came undone after D'Arco saw a man hide a gun in his shirt, then slip it into the bathroom. Recognizing this as a classic setup for a hit, D'Arco fled for his life and turned himself over to the authorities to spare him and his family from Amuso and Casso and their increasingly erratic demands. He was the first boss of a New York crime family, acting or otherwise, to become an informant.

Casso had reportedly conspired with reputed consigliere Frank Lastorino and Brooklyn faction leaders George Zappola, George Conte, Frank "Bones" Papagni and Frank Gioia Jr. into murdering Steven "Stevie" Crea, Amuso's acting underboss of the Bronx, as well as Gambino crime family acting boss John "Junior" Gotti, son of the imprisoned John Gotti, along with members of the Genovese crime family once again. But due to massive indictments, none of the plots were committed.

Law enforcement eventually caught up with the two fugitives. On July 29, 1991, the FBI captured Amuso in Scranton, Pennsylvania, and on January 19, 1993 the FBI captured Casso in Mount Olive, New Jersey. Amuso steadfastly refused all offers from the government to make a deal and become a government witness. He was convicted on all charges in 1992 and sentenced to life in prison. Believing that Casso had tipped off the FBI in hopes of taking over the family, Amuso removed Casso as underboss and declared him an outcast. Facing the prospect of spending the rest of his life in prison, Casso agreed to a deal on March 1, 1994 and started revealing family secrets.

One of the biggest secrets was that two New York Police Department detectives, Louis Eppolito and Stephen Caracappa, had been on Casso's payroll. For years, Eppolito and Caracappa had provided Casso with sensitive police information; Casso had even used them on hits. Casso related how Eppolito and Caracappa, on Christmas Day 1986, murdered an innocent Brooklyn man who had the same name as a suspected government informant. Casso told the government that in 1992 Lucchese hit men tried to kill the sister of another suspected informant, violating the alleged Mafia "rule" barring violence against family members.

Casso was thrown out of the witness protection program in 1998 after prosecutors alleged numerous infractions, in 1997, including bribing guards, assaulting other inmates and making "false statements" about Sammy "the Bull" Gravano and D'Arco. Casso's attorney tried to get Judge Frederic Block to overrule federal prosecutors in July 1998, but Block refused to do so. Shortly afterward, Judge Block sentenced Casso to 455 years in prison without possibility of parole—the maximum sentence permitted under sentencing guidelines. On December 15, 2020 Casso died in prison from complications related to previous health issues and COVID-19.

Mafia cops
In 1994, Casso revealed that two respected New York City police detectives worked as hitmen and informants for Casso during the 1980s and early 1990s before their retirement. They were Louis Eppolito and Stephen Caracappa, who spent much of their combined 44 years with the NYPD committing murders and leaking confidential information to the Lucchese family. Between 1986 and 1990, Eppolito and Caracappa participated in eight murders and received $375,000 from Casso in bribes and payments for murder 'contracts'. Casso used Caracappa and Eppolito to pressure the Gambino crime family by murdering several of their members. This is because Casso, along with the imprisoned Amuso and Genovese crime family boss Vincent Gigante, wanted their rival John Gotti out of the way. Caracappa and Eppolito are now seen as the main source of 'tension' between these three families during the late 1980s and early 1990s.

For one contract, Eppolito and Caracappa kidnapped mobster James Hydell, forced him into their car trunk, and delivered him to Casso for torture and murder. Hydell's body was never found. The two detectives also shot Bruno Facciolo, who was found in Brooklyn in the trunk of a car with a canary in his mouth. After pulling Gambino crime family captain Edward "Eddie" Lino for a routine traffic check, the detectives murdered him on the expressway in his Mercedes-Benz. In April 2006, Eppolito and Caracappa were convicted of murdering Hydell, Nicholas Guido, John "Otto" Heidel, John Doe, Anthony DiLapi, Facciolo, Lino, and Bartholomew Boriello on the orders of Casso and the Lucchese family. They were sentenced to life imprisonment.

Acting bosses DeFede and Crea

While in prison Amuso was able to regain control of the family, after Anthony Casso was imprisoned. Amuso chose Joseph "Little Joe" DeFede to become his new acting boss. DeFede, who supervised the powerful Garment District racket, reportedly earned more than $40,000 to $60,000 a month. DeFede placed Steven Crea in charge of the family's labor and construction racketeering operations. Crea increased the Lucchese family earnings from these rackets between $300,000 and $500,000 every year. Throughout the mid-1990s Amuso maintained control the family from prison with his two allies DeFede and Crea running the rackets. In 1998, as US law enforcement kept pressuring the organized crime activities in New York, DeFede was arrested and indicted on nine counts of racketeering. DeFede pleaded guilty to the charges and was sentenced to five years in prison. Amuso was angered at DeFede's guilty plea and promoted Crea as the new acting boss.

Steven "Stevie" Crea's success with the labor and construction rackets convinced Amuso that DeFede had been previously skimming off these profits. In late 1999, Amuso placed a contract on DeFede's life. On September 6, 2000, Crea and seven other Lucchese members were arrested and jailed on extortion charges, mostly to the supervising of the construction sites with various capos Dominic Truscello and Joseph Tangorra.

After Crea's imprisonment, the consigliere Louis "Lou Bagels" Daidone, took control of the family. However, Daidone's tenure was short-lived. After his release from prison, the scared DeFede became a government witness and helped the government convict Daidone of murder and conspiracy. Daidone's conviction was also helped by the testimony from Alphonse D'Arco in September 2004.

Ruling panel
With the arrest of acting boss Louis Daidone in 2003, imprisoned boss Vic Amuso created a three-man ruling panel to run the family. The panel consisted of capos Aniello Migliore, Joseph DiNapoli and Matthew Madonna, who brought the family's power back into the Bronx. In February 2004 a New York Post article stated that, the Lucchese family consisted of about 9 capos and 82 soldiers. In March 2009, an article in the New York Post stated that the Lucchese family consisted of approximately 100 "made" members.

On December 18, 2007, two members of the panel, Joseph DiNapoli and Matthew Madonna, were arrested, along with New Jersey faction capo Ralph V. Perna, soldier Nicodemo Scarfo Jr., and others. The arrests came after New Jersey law enforcement agencies revealed through investigation Operation Heat that the New Jersey faction controlled a $2.2 billion illegal gambling, money laundering and racketeering ring based in New Jersey and Costa Rica.

On October 1, 2009, the Lucchese family was hit with two separate indictments charging 49 members and associates with bribery and racketeering. In the first indictment, 29 members and associates of the Lucchese family were arrested. The indictment charged Joseph DiNapoli, Matthew Madonna and acting capo Anthony Croce with running operations that grossed nearly $400 million from illegal gambling, loansharking, gun trafficking, bribery and extortion. In the second indictment obtained from investigation "Operation Open House" 12 more Lucchese mobsters were charged with bribery. The indictment charged acting capo Andrew Disimone and other mobsters with bribing New York Police Department (NYPD) detective and sergeant posing as crooked cops to protect illegal poker parlors.

On November 18, 2009, family members were indicted under "Operation Night Gallery". Capo Anthony Croce, soldier Joseph Datello, and his brother, Frank Datello, were charged with loan sharking and bookmaking from the bar "Night Gallery" on Staten Island.

Madonna and Crea

After the ruling panel was disbanded in 2009, Matthew Madonna took over as acting boss and Joseph DiNapoli became the new consigliere. In late 2009, the parole restrictions expired on longtime underboss Steven Crea and he was able rejoin the family's leadership again.

On January 16, 2013, the FBI arrested 29 members and associates of the Genovese, Lucchese and Gambino crime families on racketeering charges related to their involvement in carting companies in Westchester County, Rockland County and Nassau County in New York, and Bergen County and Passaic County in New Jersey. Members and associates of the Genovese, Lucchese and Gambino crime families controlled waste disposal businesses by dictating which companies could pick up trash at certain locations and extorting protection payments preventing further extortion from other mobsters.

In June 2013, the New York FBI office reduced the number of agents focused on investigating the five crime families to thirty-six agents, divided into two squads. In the past the FBI had a separate squad of 10 to 20 agents investigating each crime family. Currently, the FBI has "squad C5", which at one time solely investigated the Genovese family, but will now also be investigating the Bonanno and Colombo families, and "squad C16", which previously investigated just the Gambino family, but will now be investigating the Lucchese family as well.

On May 31, 2017, 19 members and associates of the Lucchese crime family were indicted and charged by the FBI and NYPD with racketeering, assault, attempted murder, armed robbery, murder, firearms, fraud, witness tampering, money laundering, illegal gambling, narcotics and contraband cigarettes trafficking offences, which dated back to at least 2000. Members of the Lucchese leadership Matthew Madonna, Steven Crea and Joseph DiNapoli were among the accused. Lucchese associate Terrence Caldwell and soldier Christopher Londonio were accused of participating in the shooting and murder of Michael Meldish, a former leader of the East Harlem Purple Gang and Lucchese Bronx-based hitman, on November 15, 2013. Caldwell was already in custody for the May 29, 2013, attempted murder of Bonanno crime family soldier Enzo Stagno, who was shot in the chest in East Harlem, Manhattan. In late 2012, Crea ordered Vincent Bruno and soldier Paul Cassano to murder a Bonanno associate who disrespected him, the two men went to his home with guns, but the contract was not carried out. According to the FBI, Crea gave his approval in October 2016 to soldier Joseph Datello to murder an informant in New Hampshire but he was unsuccessful in finding the informer. Datello himself was accused of operating a drug smuggling ring from South America into the United States with other Lucchese mobsters, with five kilograms of cocaine, more than one kilogram of heroin and over 1,000 kilograms of marijuana allegedly brought into the country. Crea was personally charged with mail and wire fraud in connection with a skimming operation involving the construction of a New York City hospital. Originally all but two of the defendants faced the death penalty or life in prison, however in May 2018 the U.S. Attorney's Office announced that they would not seek the death penalty for Crea, Madonna, Londonio, Steven Crea Jr. and Caldwell.

On January 4, 2019 Joseph Datello was received a 14-year prison sentence, after pleading guilty to conspiracy to commit racketeering, including the attempted murder of the witness, narcotics trafficking, and collecting debts through the threat of violence on September 24, 2018. On August 20, 2019, Steven Crea Jr. pleaded guilty to racketeering and murder conspiracy charges and was later sentenced to 13 years in prison.

On November 15, 2019, Matthew Madonna, Steven Crea, Christopher Londonio and Terrence Caldwell were convicted in White Plains federal court of murdering Michael Meldish. On July 27, 2020, Madonna, Londonio and Caldwell were sentenced to life in prison for the Meldish murder. On August 27, 2020, Crea was sentenced to life in prison, along with a $400,000 fine and the forfeit of $1 million.

Current leadership
Although in prison for life, Victor Amuso remains the official boss of the Lucchese crime family.

On March 27, 2018, Lucchese crime family soldier, Dominick Capelli, and nine associates were arrested as part of Operation "The Vig Is Up". Attorney General Eric T. Schneiderman announced that it was the biggest loan sharking case investigated by the United States Attorney General Office. Over 47 people were identified as loansharking victims, who were allegedly charged exorbitant weekly loan rates averaging over 200 percent per year, effectively creating a high-cost debt trap for all individuals taking out such loans. The accused were alleged to have operated out of New Rochelle, New York and the Bronx. It was also said that the defendants ran an illegal bookmaking operation which generated over $1.5 million in annual wagers.

In a separate indictment in April 2018, Lucchese soldier Anthony Grado and associate Lawrence "Fat Larry" Tranese were arrested for forcing a doctor to prescribe them with over 230,000 oxycodone pills from 2011 through to 2013. It was noted that Grado ordered one of his peers to stab the unidentified Brooklyn-based doctor during a visit, who complied with the task. Grado was recorded threatening the doctor, saying, "If the prescriptions go in anybody’s hands besides mine, I’ll put a bullet right in your head”. Both men pleaded guilty on April 5, 2018. The investigation was conducted by wiretaps, surveillance cameras, car bugs, undercover officers, hidden cameras and cost over $1 million. Grado was sentenced to 12 years imprisonment and Tranese to over three years.

In October 2018, associate Vincent Zito was murdered at his home in Sheepshead Bay, Brooklyn. He was found shot twice in the back of his head and a handgun was recovered beside his body. Zito was allegedly a loanshark. His brother Anthony Zito was jailed for extortion in 1971 and was a known associate of current Lucchese boss Vic Amuso.

In May 2019, government witness and former Lucchese soldier John Pennisi testified in the trial against Eugene Castelle and revealed the current leadership of the crime family. Pennisi testified that in 2017, imprisoned for life boss Vic Amuso sent a letter to Underboss Steven Crea which stated that Brooklyn based mobster Michael “Big Mike” DeSantis would take over as acting boss replacing Bronx based Matthew Madonna. The testimony from Pennisi stated that if the Bronx faction refused to step aside, imprisoned boss Amuso had approved of a hit list that included a captain and several members of the Bronx faction. During Pennisi's testimony, he revealed that the Lucchese family operates with a total of seven crews – two in The Bronx, two on Long Island, one in Manhattan, one in New Jersey, and John Castellucci's-Brooklyn crew (formerly Amuso-Casso's old crew), which is now based in Tottenville section of Staten Island. Law-enforcement agents have stated that Brooklyn based mobster Patrick "Patty" Dellorusso is the new acting underboss and that the Bronx-based mobster Andrew DiSimone is the new Consigliere.

On December 16, 2020, soldier John Perna pled guilty to aggravated assault of the husband of Dina Cantin, who has appeared on Real Housewives of New Jersey. Perna was hired by Thomas Manzo, who is the ex-husband of Cantin; Perna carried out the assault in exchange for a discounted price for his wedding reception.

On September 13, 2022, five Lucchese members and associates were indicted and accused of running an extensive and long-running illegal gambling operation. Arrested for the scheme was family soldier Anthony Villani, and associates James "Quick" Coumoutsos, Dennis Filizzola, Michael "Platinum" Praino, and Louis "Tooch" Tucci, Jr. The five men faced charges included racketeering, money laundering, illegal gambling, and attempted extortion.

Historical leadership

Boss (official and acting)
 1922–1930: Gaetano "Tommy" Reina: murdered on February 26, 1930
 1930: Bonaventura "Joseph" Pinzolo: murdered on September 5, 1930
 1930–1951: Tommaso "Tommy" Gagliano: retired in 1951, died on February 16, 1953
 1951–1967: Gaetano "Tommy Brown" Lucchese: died on July 13, 1967 
 Acting 1966–1967: Carmine Tramunti: stepped down
 Acting 1967: Ettore "Eddie" Coco: stepped down
 1967–1973: Carmine "Mr. Gribbs" Tramunti: imprisoned in October 1973
 1973–1986: Anthony "Tony Ducks" Corallo: indicted on February 15, 1985, convicted on November 19, 1986 in the Mafia Commission Trial and sentenced on January 13, 1987 to 100 years in prison. Stepped down
 1986–present: Vittorio "Vic" Amuso: arrested in 1991, received a life sentence in January 1993
 Acting 1991: Alphonse "Little Al" D'Arco: demoted and became a member of a ruling panel
 Acting 1995–1998: Joseph "Little Joe" DeFede: imprisoned in 1998
 Acting 1998–2000: Steven "Stevie" Crea: imprisoned on September 6, 2000
 Acting 2000–2003: Louis "Louie Bagels" Daidone: imprisoned March 2003, received life sentence in January 2004
 Acting 2009–2017: Matthew "Matty" Madonna: indicted 2007 and 2009; indicted 2017 and stepped down, sentenced to life in prison 2020
 Acting 2017–present: Michael "Big Mike" DeSantis

Street boss
The street boss is considered the go-to-guy for the boss and is responsible to pass on orders to lower ranking members. In some instances a Ruling panel (of capos) substituted the Street boss role.
 1990–1991: Alphonse "Little Al" D'Arco: promoted to acting boss
 1991: Ruling panel: Anthony Baratta, Salvatore Avellino, Frank Lastorino and Alphonse D'Arco (September 21, 1991, D'Arco became a government witness)
 1991–1993: Ruling panel: Anthony Baratta (imprisoned June 1992), Salvatore Avellino (imprisoned April 1993) and Frank Lastorino (imprisoned April 1993)
 1993–1995: Ruling panel: Steven Crea, Joseph DeFede and Domenico Cutaia (in 1995 Cutaia was indicted)
 2003–2009: Ruling panel: Aniello Migliore, Joseph DiNapoli and Matthew Madonna: two members DiNapoli and Madonna were indicted in 2007 and indicted in 2009

Underboss (official and acting)
 1922–1930: Tommaso "Tommy" Gagliano: promoted to boss
 1930–1951: Gaetano "Tommy" Lucchese: promoted to boss
 1951–1973: Stefano "Steve" LaSalle: retired
 1973–1979: Aniello "Neil" Migliore: indicted 
 Acting 1974–1976: Andimo "Tony Noto" Pappadio: murdered on September 24, 1976
 1979–1986: Salvatore "Tom Mix" Santoro Sr.: imprisoned in the Commission Case
 1986–1989: Mariano "Mac" Macaluso: retired in 1989
 1989–1993: Anthony "Gaspipe" Casso: fugitive from January 1991 until his arrest on January 19, 1993; became government witness in 1994; died on December 15, 2020
 Acting 1991–1992: Anthony "Bowat" Baratta: imprisoned in June 1992.
 1993–2020: Steven "Stevie" Crea: acting boss 1998–2000; imprisoned 2000–2006; indicted 2017, life sentenced on August 27, 2020, demoted
 Acting 1998–2000: Eugene "Boopsie" Castelle: imprisoned in November 2000
 Acting 2000–2002: Joseph "Joe C." Caridi: indicted on November 14, 2002
 Acting 2002–2006: Aniello "Neil" Migliore: stepped down
 Acting 2017–2020: Patrick "Patty" Dellorusso: became underboss
 2020–present: Patrick "Patty" Dellorusso

Consigliere (official and acting)
 1931–1953: Stefano "Steve" LaSalle: promoted to underboss 
 1953–1974: Vincenzo "Vinny" Rao: imprisoned from 1965 to 1970, retired
 Acting 1965–1967: Mariano "Mac" Macaluso
 Acting 1967–1974: Paul "Paulie" Vario: imprisoned 1974 to 1976
 1974–1979: Vincent "Vinnie Beans" Foceri: died in 1979
 1981–1996: Christopher "Christie Tick" Furnari: imprisoned from 1986 to September 19, 2014
 Acting 1986–1987: Ettore "Eddie" Coco: retired
 Acting 1987: Aniello Migliore: imprisoned 
 Acting 1987–1989: Anthony "Gaspipe" Casso: promoted to underboss
 Acting 1990–1991: Steven "Stevie" Crea
 Acting 1991–1993: Frank "Big Frank" Lastorino: imprisoned in April 1993
 Acting 1993–1996: Frank "Frankie Bones" Papagni: imprisoned in September 1996
 1996–2002: Louis "Louie Bagels" Daidone: promoted to acting boss in 2000
 2002–2006: Joseph "Joe C." Caridi: imprisoned 2003–2009
 Acting 2003–2006: Joseph "Joey D." DiNapoli: became Consigliere
 2006–2017: Joseph "Joey D." DiNapoli: indicted 2007 and 2009; indicted 2017 and stepped down
 2017–present: Andrew DiSimone:

Current family members

Administration
 Boss – Vittorio "Vic" Amuso – became boss in 1986 and remains the official boss of the crime family. Amuso has been imprisoned since 1992 and continues to rule the family from prison. It was revealed in May 2019, by government informant and former Lucchese family soldier John Pennisi that Amuso is still the boss of the family. Amuso had written a letter in 2017, to Underboss Steven Crea which stated that DeSantis would take over as acting boss, replacing Bronx-based Matthew Madonna. If Amuso's orders were not followed he approved of murdering a number of Bronx faction members.
 Acting Boss – Michael "Big Mike" DeSantis – became acting boss in 2017, when Vic Amuso sent a letter to Underboss Steven Crea which stated that DeSantis would take over as acting boss, replacing Bronx-based Matthew Madonna. If Amuso's orders were not followed he approved of murdering a number of Bronx faction members.
 Underboss – Patrick "Patty" Dellorusso – became underboss in 2020, after Steven Crea was imprisoned. In 2017, he was made capo of the old Brooklyn Crew and later promoted to acting underboss. Dellorusso was a long-time member of the old "Vario-Cutaia Crew" and was involved in racketeering through the air-freight unions.
 Consigliere – Andrew DiSimone – current Consigliere. DiSimone is a member of the family's Bronx faction. DiSimone was indicted in 2009, along soldier Dominic Capelli and associate John Alevis, on bribery and illegal gambling charges.

Caporegimes
According to the May 2019, testimony of government witness and former Lucchese soldier John Pennisi the Lucchese family operates with a total of seven crews – two in The Bronx, two on Long Island, one in Manhattan, one in New Jersey, and one Brooklyn crew.

The Bronx faction
 Anthony "Blue" Santorelli – caporegime operating in Bronx. In the 1990s, Santorelli led The Tanglewood Boys, a recruitment gang for the Lucchese family.
Acting – Alfred "Freddy Boy" Santorelli – acting caporegime of his father's Bronx crew.
 Joseph "Joey Relay" Lubrano – caporegime operating in Bronx. In May 2010, Lubrano arrested on armed robbery and racketeering charges, the FBI identified him as a caporegime with close ties to mobster in Arthur Ave area of the Bronx. Lubrano was released from prison on October 31, 2014.
 Frank "Skinny Frank" Salerno – caporegime operating in Bronx. In May 2020, Salerno was identified in an FBI surveillance photo meeting with Lucchese family members acting boss Mike DeSantis, consigliere Andrew DeSimone, soldier Anthony Villani, soldier Anthony Baratta and caporegime George Zappola.
 Unknown – caporegime of the Bronx-Crea Crew after Steven "Stevie Junior" Crea was imprisoned in May 2017.

Long Island faction
 Carmine Avellino – caporegime of the Long Island-Queens crew and brother to Salvatore Avellino. In 2014, Avellino was charged with ordering two Lucchese associates to assault a 70-year-old man over a late payment of $100,000 in 2010. On August 12, 2016, Avellino was the last in the case to plead guilty, his associates Daniel Capra and Michael Capra pled guilty earlier. He pleaded guilty to extortion after he attempted to collect an outstanding loan by the use of threats. On May 23, 2017, Avellino was sentenced to one year of house arrest and five years probation and fined $100,000. His attorney stated during the trial that Avellino had suffered two heart attacks and is suffering from Parkinson's disease.
 Joseph "Joe Cafe" DeSena – caporegime of a Long Island crew. DeSena operates from Cafe Napoli in Little Italy. DeSena began his criminal career as an associate in the Gambino family before becoming a member of the Lucchese family. In the early 2010s, DeSena was an associate of Gambino family capo Ignazio "Uncle Iggy" Alonga. His nephew, Pete Tuccio, is a Gambino family associate and former driver for Philadelphia boss Joseph Merlino.

Brooklyn-Staten Island faction
 Unknown – caporegime of the Brooklyn Crew since Patrick Dellorusso has become underboss.
 Unknown – caporegime of the Brooklyn-Staten Island crew after former capo John "Big John" Castellucci was imprisoned in 2019. Former crew member and government witness John Pennisi testified in May 2019 that Castellucci's-Brooklyn crew was based in the Tottenville section of Staten Island.

Manhattan faction
 Unknown – caporegime of the Prince Street crew after the death of Dominic Truscello in July 2018.

New Jersey faction
 George "Georgie Neck" Zappola – caporegime of the New Jersey crew. Zappola was a close ally to Anthony Casso and a powerful member of the Brooklyn faction. In 1996, Zappola sentenced to 22 years in prison on several murder charges. On March 3, 2014, he was released from prison.
Acting – Joseph R. "Big Joe" Perna – acting caporegime of the New Jersey crew and son of former Lucchese member Michael J. Perna.

Labor racketeering
The Lucchese family used members to take control of various unions in the United States. The members extorted money from the unions by blackmail, strong-arming, violence and other methods. Similar to the other four crime families of New York City they worked on controlling entire unions. With the mob having control over a union, they controlled the entire market. Bid-rigging allows the mob to get a percentage of the income on the construction deal, only allowing certain companies to bid on jobs after they pay them first. The mob also allows companies to use non-union workers to work on jobs, in which case the companies must give a kickback to the mob.  Unions give mob members jobs on the books to show a legitimate source of income. The Mafia members get into high union positions and embezzling money from the organization.
 Clothes manufacturing – In the Garment District of Manhattan, the Union of Needletrades, Industrial and Textile Employees Locals 10, 23, 24, and 25 were controlled by members of the Lucchese family. Lucchese associates would extort the businesses and organize strikes. Today some unions still are working for the family.
 Kosher meat companies – In the early 1960s Giovanni "Johnny Dio" Dioguardi merged Consumer Kosher Provisions Company and American Kosher Provisions Inc. Dio was able to control a large portion of the Kosher food market, forcing supermarkets to buy from his companies at his prices.
 Food distribution – At the Hunts Point Cooperative Market in the Hunts Point section of the Bronx, the Lucchese family controlled unions involved in the food distribution industry.
 Airport services and freight handling – At John F. Kennedy International Airport, LaGuardia and Newark Liberty, the unions were controlled by the Lucchese family.
 Construction – Teamsters unions in New York City and New Jersey have been under Lucchese family control. Mason Tenders Locals 46, 48, and 66 were controlled by the old Vario Crew.
 Newspaper production and delivery – In November 2009, Manhattan District Attorney Robert Morgenthau  sent search warrants to investigate the Newspaper and Mail Deliverers Union. This union controlled circulation, production and delivery offices at The New York Times, The New York Post, The New York Daily News and El Diario La Prensa. When the Cosa Nostra took control over the union, the price and costs for newspapers increased. Charges were brought against many union members as well as the former union President Douglas LaChance, who was accused of being a Lucchese crime family associate.  In the 1980s LaChance was convicted on labor racketeering charges and served five years in prison. He was also involved in the Manhattan 1990s case in which the New York Post was being strong-armed into switching their delivery companies, but was acquitted.

French Connection
The French Connection Crew (1967–1973) was an organization, closely aligned with the Lucchese family, who were responsible for the theft of approximately $70 million in heroin taken from the NYPD property room.
 Virgil Alessi
 Louis Cirillo
 Anthony Loria
 Vincent Papa
 Anthony Pasero

Government informants and witnesses
 Eugenio "Gino" Giannini – was born in 1906 in Calabria. In 1925, he was imprisoned at Sing Sing for robbery, he began serving time at Dannemora prison for possession of a handgun and larceny in 1928 upon his release. By the early 1930s, he became associated with the American Mafia. In mid 1934, he was arrested for armed robbery and for the May 1934 murder of New York police officer, Arthur Philip Rasmussen. His last known arrest was in 1942 for trafficking narcotics and served over one year in prison. It is noted that Giannini was heavily involved in the narcotic trade from the 1930s until his murder in 1952. In the heroin trade, he was acquainted with Pasquale Moccio, Vincenzo Mauro, Salvatore Shillitani, Giovanni Ormento and Joseph Valachi. He became an informer around 1950 for the FBN and began informing on his heroin connection, Charles Luciano. It is believed his murder was ordered by Genovese crime family captain Anthony Strollo, who tasked Valachi to murder Giannini. Valachi then ordered Joseph and Pasquale Pagano and Fiore Siano to carry out the shooting on September 20, 1952.
 Dominick "The Gap" Petrilli – former soldier. He served time at Sing Sing prison during the 1920s and befriended future Genovese soldier Joseph Valachi. In 1928, Valachi introduced him to Girolamo Santuccio and Gaetano Gagliano, who was the underboss of the Lucchese family at the time. Petrilli later served as a driver for Gagliano. In 1942, he was deported to Italy after he was convicted of narcotic charges. Ten years later, Petrilli reentered the United States and was murdered one month later in the Bronx by three gunmen, on December 9, 1953. It was later revealed that Petrilli was an acquaintance of the late Dutch Schultz, who had once hidden at his home in Newburgh, New York.
 Henry Hill – he is best known as the subject of the 1990 film Goodfellas. Hill was active since 1955 until his cooperation in 1980, after facing a minimum of 25 years in prison for drug charges. He became associated with Paul Vario and his crew in Brooklyn, and later Jimmy Burke. Hill and Tommy DeSimone were involved in the April 7, 1967 Air France robbery in which $420,000 was taken. The Lufthansa heist was also a robbery at John F. Kennedy International Airport on December 11, 1978. An estimated $5.875 million (equivalent to $ million in ) was stolen from the German airline Lufthansa, with $5 million in cash and $875,000 in jewelry, making it the largest cash robbery committed on American soil at the time. The plot had begun when bookmaker Martin Krugman told Hill Lufthansa flew in currency to its cargo terminal at John F. Kennedy International Airport; Jimmy Burke set the plan in motion, although Hill did not directly take part in the heist. By the late 1970s, he became an alcoholic and cocaine addict, and even sold narcotics himself. Vario disowned him and Burke was planning his murder as he believed Hill would eventually become an informant if he got caught due to his excessive cocaine use. In 1980, Hill was arrested on a narcotics-trafficking charge. With a long sentence hanging over him, Hill agreed to become an informant and signed an agreement with the Strike Force on May 27, 1980. Hill testified against his former associates to avoid impending prosecution and being murdered by his crew. His testimony led to 50 convictions. Hill, his wife Karen Hill, and their two children (Gregg and Gina) entered the U.S. Marshals' Witness Protection Program in 1980, changed their names, and moved to an undisclosed location. Burke was given 12 years in prison for the 1978–79 Boston College point shaving scandal, involving fixing Boston College basketball games. Burke was also later sentenced to life in prison for the murder of scam artist Richard Eaton. Burke died of cancer while serving his life sentence, on April 13, 1996, at the age of 64. Paul Vario received four years for helping Henry Hill obtain a no-show job to get him paroled from prison. Vario was also later sentenced to ten years in prison for the extortion of air freight companies at JFK Airport. He died of respiratory failure on November 22, 1988, at age 73 while incarcerated in the FCI Federal Prison in Fort Worth. Hill died of complications related to heart disease in a Los Angeles hospital, on June 12, 2012, after a long battle with his illness, a day after his 69th birthday.
 Peter "Fat Pete" Chiodo – former capo. Chiodo was initiated into the Lucchese family in 1987. He became a government witness in 1991 after a failed assassination attempt, which resulted in Chiodo being shot 12 times at a gas station in Staten Island. His failed murder attempt was believed to be ordered by Anthony Casso who disapproved of his plea deal in the "Windows case". According to Chiodo, he had turned down several attempts by the government to persuade him into becoming an informer, however the threats against his wife and father eventually persuaded him. As a result of his cooperation with the government, Casso and Lucchese boss Vic Amuso ordered murder contracts on his sister and uncle. His uncle, Frank Signorino, was found shot in the head inside of the trunk of his car in 1993, and his sister was shot several times in 1992 but survived. By 2007, he had testified in seven American Mafia trials, including against Genovese boss Vincent Gigante, and admitted to his involvement in five murders. Chiodo died in 2016.
 Alphonse "Little Al" D'Arco – the first boss, acting or otherwise, of the American Mafia to turn informer. D'Arco was active since the 1950s. He admitted to receiving dozens of murder contracts by Casso and Amuso, including an assignment to "wipe out the entire New Jersey faction", which consisted of 15 men, in 1988. He became the acting boss of the Lucchese family for several months until his cooperation in late 1991. According to D'Arco, he became a government witness as he was responsible for the failed murder attempt on Lucchese capo Peter Chiodo who survived 12 gunshots, and believed he was next to be murdered as a result of "screwing it up". His testimony almost destroyed the Lucchese family. Jerry Capeci and novelist Tom Robbins released a book about D'Arco in October 2013. D'Arco died in 2019.
 Joseph D'Arco – former soldier and son of acting boss Alphonse D'Arco. It is noted that he participated in the February 1990 murder of Anthony DiLapi, an unpredictable Lucchese soldier based in California, after receiving orders from his father.
 Anthony "Tumac" Accetturo – former capo and leader of the Lucchese-New Jersey faction. Accetturo was known for his brawler characteristics on the street and became active with the Lucchese family in 1955. In 1988, he was acquitted of racketeering and other crimes alongside 19 other Lucchese mobsters. At his trial, prosecutors alleged that he controlled most of New Jersey's illegal gambling, drug dealing, loansharking and credit card scam operations. Though he has denied any involvement in murders, he admitted to being aware of at least 13 murders. According to an informant in 1992, Accetturo ordered a contract on Caesar Vitale, who was murdered after he failed to repay $800,000 which he was given to fund his cocaine business. Accetturo was convicted of racketeering in August 1993 and faced a maximum of 60 years in prison, and a death sentence ordered by the Lucchese family hierarchy in New York. In late 1993, he agreed to become an informer and to provide information for the government. Accetturo was sentenced to 20 years in prison in 1993 and was released in 2002.
 Thomas Angelo Ricciardi –former soldier who was based around Toms River, New Jersey. Like his superior, Anthony Accetturo, he decided to turn informer in 1993. He was also convicted in the August 1993 trial which targeted the Lucchese family and the New Jersey faction, for racketeering and the 1984 murder of Vincent J. Craparotta Sr. who was beaten to death with a golf club. In September 1993, before he was to appear in a bribery case involving the Newark sanitation department, it was confirmed that he had flipped.
 Frank "Goo Goo" Suppa – former soldier who was based in South Florida. Suppa was a member of Anthony Accetturo's New Jersey faction, however it was later revealed that he was mostly active in Florida. He was indicted in 1985 for several crimes alongside 19 others and was acquitted in 1988. In 1993, he was arrested on cocaine charges, pleaded guilty and began to cooperate with the government.
 Anthony "Gaspipe" Casso – he is  regarded as the most ruthless Lucchese crime family mobster, and arguably one of the most vicious gangsters in history. Casso has been suspected of being involved with dozens of murders Casso had admitted to 15 murders. According to Alphonse D'Arco, he had prepared a hit list of 49 potential informants which was given to him in 1990, and by 1992, ten out of the 49 were murdered. Casso became an associate of Christopher Furnari during the late 1950s and was inducted into the Lucchese family in the 1970s. In 1961, he was arrested for attempted murder and later acquitted. Anthony Corallo appointed him as boss in 1987, however Casso suggested that his longtime friend Vic Amuso should take the reins, with Casso instead becoming consigliere and later underboss at the time of his downfall. It is believed Casso was in charge despite not being official boss. He became a fugitive in May 1990, two days before he was scheduled to be indicted in a $142 million bid-rigging case and for ordering 11 murders, including conspiring to order three more, Casso was captured by 25 FBI agents in January 1993. While in custody, he planned the murder of Eugene Nickerson, the presiding judge in his case, and tried to figure a way for Lucchese mobsters to ambush his prison transportation bus and then free him. Before his plans were carried out, Amuso banished him from the Lucchese family due to suspicions of Casso attempting to seize control of the crime family. Casso became an informer in March 1994 and pleaded guilty to extortion, racketeering and 15 murders. He also admitted to having two NYPD officers on his payroll, who were convicted of murdering eight people on behalf of Casso. Casso died on December 15, 2020.
 Frank "Spaghetti Man" Gioia Jr. – he was initiated into the Lucchese family in October 1991. Gioia was arrested in June 1992 on gun charges and then in 1993 for operating a heroin trafficking ring from Manhattan to Boston.  Gioia was planning to murder current Lucchese underboss Steven Crea, along with George Zappola and Frankie Papagni, for the purpose of avoiding a power shift in the Lucchese hierarchy. He was sentenced to seven years in prison and agreed to cooperate in late 1994 while imprisoned, after hearing that his sponsor, Lucchese capo George Zappola and his original sponsor, was planning to murder his father; Gioia was released in 1999. It is noted that by 1998, his testimony secured the convictions of more than 60 American Mafia members and associates, including Louis Vallario and Michael DiLeonardo from the Gambino crime family, and three other captains from the New York crime families. He entered the Witness Protection Program upon his release and relocated to Phoenix, Arizona.
 Frank Gioia Sr. – the father of Frank Gioia Sr. and a former soldier. After facing a contract on his life, he cooperated with the government along with his son in 1994.
 Joseph "Little Joe" DeFede – born in 1934. DeFede was originally an associate of the Colombo crime family, but he renewed his friendship with Vic Amuso and later became inducted into the Lucchese family in 1989. He is the former acting boss, appointed by Amuso in 1993. In 1998, he admitted to involvement in the Lucchese-infiltration of the New York garment district. DeFede was active in Queens and Brooklyn, and operated gambling, extortion and loansharking operations. In his later years, he commented that he and his wife essentially did not have a life and couldn't visit his children in New York due to reprimands of the New York crime families and that he extremely struggled each week in terms of gaining money. He died in Florida in 2012.
 Vincent "Vinny Baldy" Salanardi – former soldier who turned in 2004. In 2002, he was arrested on racketeering and other charges alongside 21 other Lucchese mobsters, he was also overheard discussing a few assaults on a wiretap, and ordered an associate to find a debtor who owed him money, insisting that the associate should "bring him back bloody". He was sentenced to over 11 years in prison and ordered to pay $35,000 in restitution and immediately began cooperating after his arrest.
 Frank Lagano – former soldier. Lagano was arrested in 2004 on gambling and loansharking charges, as part of "Operation Jersey Boyz", it is believed he became an informer shortly after his arrest. In 2007, he was shot to death in East Brunswick, New Jersey.
 Burton Kaplan – former Jewish-associate. In 1973, he was sentenced to four years in prison for theft. It is noted that he acted as a liaison between Lucchese underboss Anthony Casso and two of his NYPD hitman-cops, Stephen Caracappa and Louis Eppolito. In 2004, while serving a 27-year sentence for operating a $10 million marijuana trafficking ring, he decided to cooperate with the government. It was revealed in 2005 that he had invited dozens of American Mafia mobsters to his daughter's wedding as a way of bringing her more clients as she practised law and was a defense attorney, he also admitted to failing his daughter. Kaplan died in July 2009. In 2017, his daughter Deborah Kaplan, was appointed as an administrative judge in New York.
 Steven LaPella – former associate. It is believed he became an informer shortly after his February 2008 indictment for racketeering.
 John Pennisi – inducted in 2013 by Matthew Madonna. In October 2018, he began cooperating with the FBI. Pennisi revealed the 2017 change in family leadership to authorities.

In popular culture
 In 1969, in the novel The Godfather (and in the 1972 film and 2006 video game), the Cuneo crime family is based on the Lucchese crime family. Similar to the Luccheses, the Cuneo family is largely active in The Bronx and New Jersey.
 In the 1981 film Gangster Wars, Gaetano "Tommy Brown" Lucchese was played by actor Jon Polito.
 The 1990 film Goodfellas was based on Henry Hill's recollections about his involvement with The Vario Crew of the Lucchese family.
 In the 1991 film Mobsters, Tommy Reina was played by actor Christopher Penn.
 In the 1991 film Out for Justice, the William Forsythe character "Richard Madano" was allegedly based on Lucchese mobster Matthew Madonna.
 In the 1999–2007 HBO TV show The Sopranos, main character Anthony Soprano was partially based on Lucchese mobster Michael Taccetta.
 In 2005 and 2006, a fictionalized version of The Tanglewood Boys was featured on CSI: NY, in episode 1.13 "Tanglewood" and in episode 2.20 "Run Silent, Run Deep".
 The 2006 film Find Me Guilty was based on the 1980s trial of 20 members of the Lucchese Jersey Crew.
 In the 2007 film American Gangster, the Armand Assante character Dominic Cattano was based on Lucchese mobster Carmine Tramunti.
 In the 2008 Rockstar North video game Grand Theft Auto IV, the fictional Lupisella family resembles on the Lucchese family. The Lupisella family is mainly based in Bohan, the Grand Theft Auto IV version of the Bronx, and is operating in Liberty City, the game's version of New York City.

Notes

References
 
 DeStefano, Anthony. The Last Godfather: Joey Massino & the Fall of the Bonanno Crime Family. California: Citadel, 2006.
 Jacobs, James B., Coleen Friel and Robert Radick. Gotham Unbound: How New York City Was Liberated from the Grip of Organized Crime. New York: NYU Press, 1999. 
 Critchley, David. The Origin of Organized Crime in America: The New York City Mafia, 1891–1931
 Devico, Peter J. The Mafia Made Easy: The Anatomy and Culture of La Cosa Nostra
 Rudolph, Robert. The Boys from New Jersey: How the Mob Beat the Feds
 Mass, Peter. The Valachi Papers, New York: Pocket Books, 1986. .

Further reading
 DeVico, Peter J. The Mafia Made Easy: The Anatomy and Culture of La Cosa Nostra. Tate Publishing, 2007. 
 Rudolph, Robert C. The Boys from New Jersey: How the Mob Beat the Feds. New York: William Morrow and Company Inc., 1992. 
 Capeci, Jerry. The Complete Idiot's Guide to the Mafia. Indianapolis: Alpha Books, 2002. 
 Davis, John H. Mafia Dynasty: The Rise and Fall of the Gambino Crime Family. New York: HarperCollins, 1993. 
 Jacobs, James B., Christopher Panarella and Jay Worthington. Busting the Mob: The United States Vs. Cosa Nostra. New York: NYU Press, 1994. 
 Maas, Peter. Underboss: Sammy the Bull Gravano's Story of Life in the Mafia. New York: HarperCollins Publishers, 1997. 
 Volkman, Ernest. Gangbusters: The Destruction of America's Last Great Mafia Dynasty  New York, Avon Books, 1998 
 Eppolito, Louis. Mafia Cop: The Story of an Honest Cop whose Family Was the Mob. 
 Lawson, Guy and Oldham, William. The Brotherhoods: The True Story of Two Cops Who Murdered for the Mafia. 
 Jacobs, James B., Coleen Friel and Robert Radick. Gotham Unbound: How New York City Was Liberated from the Grip of Organized Crime. New York: NYU Press, 1999.

External links
 Lucchese Crime Family News – The New York Times
 Lucchese Crime Family Epic: Descent into Darkness Part I by Thomas L. Jones
 American Gangland: Lucchese Crime Family
 Dieland: Mob: The Lucchese Family
 Dieland: Mob: The New Jersey Crew
 La Cosa Nostra – Lengthy Prison Terms for Lucchese Crime Family Members (FBI)

 
Organizations established in the 1920s
1920s establishments in New York City
Organizations based in New York City
Five Families
Gangs in Florida
Gangs in New York City